Stigmella rhoifoliella is a moth of the family Nepticulidae. It is found in Ohio and Kentucky in the United States.
The wingspan is 3.2-4.2 mm. Late instar larvae may be found in June, late July and September. Adults are on wing in June and particularly August. There are two to three generations per year.

The larvae feed on Rhus toxicodendron. They mine the leaves of their host plant. The mine is much contorted, linear and located on the upper surface of the leaf. The frass is dispersed in most places and granular throughout the entire width of the mine.

External links
Nepticulidae of North America
A taxonomic revision of the North American species of Stigmella (Lepidoptera: Nepticulidae)

Nepticulidae
Moths of North America
Moths described in 1912